Gavi or GAVI may refer to:

Places
 Gavi (island), a small Italian island in the Mediterranean Sea
 Gavi, Bushehr, a village in Bushehr province, Iran
 Gavi, Kerala, a village in Pathanamthitta, in Kerala state, India
 Gavi, Piedmont, is a municipality in the province of Alessandria in the northwestern Italian region Piedmont
 Gavi, Sistan and Baluchestan, a village in Sistan and Baluchestan province, Iran
 Gavi-ye Sofla, a village in South Khorasan province, Iran

People
 Gavi (footballer) (Pablo Martín Páez Gavira; born 2004), Spanish association footballer

Other
 Cortese di Gavi, a wine appellation, produced in the area of the Piemontese town above, often called simply Gavi
 GAVI (originally Global Alliance for Vaccines and Immunization), an international partnership that promotes vaccination
 Gavi Gangadhareshwara Temple, an Indian rock-cut architecture in Bangalore
 Gavi Dam in Pathanamthitta district of Kerala, India